María Alicia Villalba Acosta (born 28 February 1988) is a Paraguayan handball goalkeeper for San José Handball and the Paraguay national team.

She represented Paraguay at the 2013 World Women's Handball Championship in Serbia, where the Paraguayan team placed 21st.

References

Paraguayan female handball players
1988 births
Living people
20th-century Paraguayan women
21st-century Paraguayan women
South American Games silver medalists for Paraguay
South American Games medalists in handball
Competitors at the 2022 South American Games